The 2008 Kansas Democratic presidential caucuses took held on Super Tuesday, February 5, 2008, with 21 delegates at stake. The remaining 11 delegates were selected at the Kansas Democratic Party District Conventions on April 12. The state, and a majority of its delegates, were won by Barack Obama.

Process

The Kansas Democratic Caucus was open to all registered Democrats, non-Democrats, 17-year-olds eligible to vote by the general election, and new voters who could register or re-register at the door. Surrogates were permitted for religious observance, military service, legislative service, or physical disability. At the caucus, participants gathered into preference groups. There was a 15-percent minimum threshold required for viability at the precinct level, with re-caucusing among all participants permitted. After re-caucusing, the results were tallied and reported to state party headquarters, and delegates were selected to Congressional District Conventions on April 12, who then selected delegates to the Kansas Democratic Party State Convention on May 17. In Kansas, delegates' pledges are binding to congressional districts at the precinct level, unlike most other caucuses, where delegates are unpledged up to the Congressional District Convention level.

Polls

Results

Local Unit Convention Results

Convention Date: February 5, 2008

National Pledged Delegates Determined: 21 (of 32)

District Convention Results
Allocation of delegates to candidates was pre-determined by the results of the local unit conventions on February 5. Only the persons filling the roles of delegates and alternates were chosen at this event.

Convention Date: April 12, 2008

National Pledged Delegates Determined: 0 (of 32)

State Convention Results
Convention Date: May 17, 2008

Analysis
As he did throughout all other states that held caucuses, Barack Obama defeated Hillary Rodham Clinton by a nearly three-to-one margin in Kansas, one of the reddest states in the nation. Obama, however, had roots in Kansas, as it was the state where his mother was born and raised. Obama also received a huge endorsement from former Governor Kathleen Sebelius who was at the time a very popular Democratic Governor in a very Republican state. The endorsement by Sebelius, who went on to serve as Secretary of Health & Human Services in the Obama Administration, along with Obama's roots in the state, may have contributed to his large victory in the Kansas Democratic Primary. He won a majority of counties and carried all four of the state's congressional districts. Clinton only carried three counties in the state - Franklin, Linn and Miami (both Miami and Linn are situated along the state's border with Missouri where Clinton did far better). Clinton also tied Obama in 16 counties but these were relatively rural and far less populated areas that could not be overweighed by his margins in the more populated, urban areas including Kansas City, Lawrence, Topeka, and Wichita.

See also
 2008 Democratic Party presidential primaries
 2008 Kansas Republican presidential caucuses

References

Kansas
2008 Kansas elections
2008
2008 Super Tuesday